Ben Andrews (May 16, 1942 – May 13, 1981) was an American actor best remembered for his television work.

Career
Making his first television appearance in the late 1960s, Andrews is perhaps best known for portraying the prominent character Benny and Jason Tate in the daytime soap opera Return to Peyton Place between 1972 and 1973. Afterwards, he played a detective on the soap opera Days of Our Lives and he was attached to General Hospital.

Besides appearing in soap operas, Andrews also guest starred in several TV series, including Planet of the Apes, The Streets of San Francisco, Mannix, The Six Million Dollar Man, The Rockford Files and The Waltons.

External links

1942 births
1981 deaths
American male soap opera actors
American male television actors
20th-century American male actors